Filippo Lussana  (17 December 1820 – 25 December 1897) was an Italian physiologist. 
In his medical research he dealt with the laws of nutrition, functions of the nervous system, cerebral localization, gustatory innervation, the relationship between touch and pain, and the causes of dizziness, and pellagra. Lussana was the author of more than two hundred scientific publications, receiving two gold medals from the Royal Society of Medical Sciences and Natural Sciences in Brussels and the Royal Academy of Medicine of Belgium, for his studies on "Fiber and blood" and "Monograph on the encephalic centers".

In addition to research, Filippo Lussana was also a writer, a painter and a poet. Combining art and science, he tried to find a dialectical relationship between imagination and analysis, and to achieve a rational synthesis.

Life 

Filippo Lussana was born in Cenate Sopra, in Valpredina on 17 September 1820, son of Felice Lussana and Barbara Epis.
His home town was in the province of Bergamo, at that time in the Habsburg Kingdom of Lombardy–Venetia.
After elementary school, he attended the "Angelo Mai" college in Clusone in Val Seriana, 
where he obtained a solid foundation of Latin and classical culture. 
On the death of Francis II, Holy Roman Emperor in 1835, the Rhetoric topic assigned to the pupils was entitled "The Roman Caesar and the Austrian Caesar".
Aged fifteen, Lussana wrote "The triumphant Roman Caesar forgave all his enemies; the Austrian Caesar imprisoned them in Spielberg." For such a sacrilegious abuse of authority he was sentenced to imprisonment in his room for three days on a diet of bread and water. An hour later he was sent to the rector Cantelli, who asked him where these ideas had come from. Lussana replied that he had read Le mie prigioni (My Prison) by Silvio Pellico, at which the rector forgave the precocious scholar.

Between 1839 and 1844 Lussana attended the Faculty of Medicine of the University of Pavia.
He was a pupil of Bartolomeo Panizza, who encouraged him to engage in scientific research.
His dissertation was on identification of the causative agent in poisoning, and the next year a paper by Lussana on "Creosote as a cause of poisoning in smoked meat products" was published in the Annals of Medicine.

After graduating in 1844, Lussana worked as a doctor in several parts of Bergamo, first in San Pellegrino Terme, then Zogno, Mologno in Casazza 
and finally in Gandino.  In 1848 he was a member of the Medical Commission of the national army of the Provisional Government of Lombardy.
He observed the Cholera epidemic in Gandino in 1855, co-authoring a report on the epidemic with his brother Peter.
In 1859 he enlisted as a medical officer among the volunteers of the Gandino military.
Throughout the years leading up to the Italian unification of 1860, while practicing as a doctor he also wrote over forty scientific works.

In 1860 Lussana was appointed Professor of Physiology at the University of Parma in succession to G. Albini.
In 1867 he was asked to transfer to the University of Padua, where he was Professor of Anatomy and Physiology until 1889,
when he retired for health reasons and was made Professor Emeritus of the university.
His retirement was due to an infection that was destroying his jawbone.
He moved to Cenate Sotto, near his home town, where he was mayor for three years, from 1894 to 1897. 
He died on 25  December 1897.

Work

Lussana became involved in physiology at a time when the study of this discipline was declining in Italy, and in an isolated area like Gandino, where as a pupil of Bartolomeo Panizza he did not have a school or a laboratory. For Lussana physiology was a discipline in its own right and not just a complement to anatomy. 
He understood the importance of comparative anatomy in its application to issues of physiology. 
Building on his field experience as doctor, he was able to originate and elaborate general and original concepts. 
His publications were widely reported in Italy and abroad, contributing to the deepening of physiological research.

Physiology of pain

Lussana published a book on the Physiology of pain in 1859, dedicating it to Paolo Mantegazza, who was later to write his own book on the subject.
Lussana distinguished mental and physical pain.
The one is derived from the intellect and may affect the body, while the other is derived from the body and may affects the intellect.
He gave as examples the statue of Laocoön and the painting of Mary in Michelangelo's "Last Judgement". 
Similarly, he contrasted the frenzy and fury of Hercules described by Ovid with the pain of Count Ugolino of Dante.

Studies on the brain and nerve centers

In the essay "Study program on the physiology of the nervous system" (1851), 
Lussana anticipates the more precise demonstration of Paul Broca on the location of the language centers of the brain. 
Lussana presents the case of a patient with loss of articulate speech as a result of an injury to the skull, 
and recovery of the same after the removal of bone fragments from that brain region. 
In 1853 he had the opportunity to attend along a young man with cancer of the cerebellum, publishing observations on the physiology of that organ ("The pathology of the cerebellum", Milan, 1856). Studying the origin of vertigo, Lussana shows the importance of the coordinating function of the brain, emphasizing how the sensations of the muscles, sight and hearing are necessary to regulate movements ("Monograph of dizziness", Milan 1858)
His study on muscle sense contributed to understanding of the part played by the cerebellum in balance, 
which provided a basis for later studies by Luigi Luciani on this organ.

Physiology of language and physiological alphabet

Continuing his studies on the physiology of language, Lussana tried to explain the physiological relationship to graphics of numbers and letters. 
He questioned the necessity of the decimal system and the figures of Roman and Arabic numerals. Finally, in the essay "Physiological Alphabet" he provided evidence to codify a language that is a result of physiology and anatomy of the human brain, and therefore the same for all languages, as already proposed at the time by Voltaire. Going on to study facial expressions, Lussana challenged art and science, trying to explain the different expressions that are related to the emotions and passions.

Sounds, colors and tastes

His hobby as a painter made Lussana interested in perception of color. Lussana stated that the language of color is innate and not learned, and demonstrated the existence of a natural relationship between emotions and colors.
In this he perhaps anticipated Kandinsky.
He was one of the pioneers of the concept of "colored hearing" considered as a foundation for creativity based on studies of the music of his age.
Even color and sound vibrations would be related, and he related Newton's seven intervals of the solar spectrum to the seven tones of the musical scale.

In 1865 Lussana published a paper under the pseudonym of "Filinto" called Lettere di Fisiologia morale dei colori (Letters on the moral physiology of colors).  He introduced the concept of a language of colors, and explained the Synesthesia of color and hearing based on  Isaac Newton's theory of sound and color.
In his view, given in more detail in an 1873 paper, lights rays followed the optic nerves to the optic thalamus, where they were converted into sensations, and then to an area in the third frontal cerebral convolution where they became ideas. This area was connected to a center of language, as was an area that handled sounds, and both types of vibration could be converted into emotions.

Concerning hearing, Lussana argues that auditory vertigo, a disorder of the movements of the head and body, is due to a lesion of the semicircular canals, because the victim cannot perceive the direction of sounds ("The semicircular canals and the vertigo of Meniere", Naples 1891). 
As for flavors, Lussana notes that the bitter taste is perceived on the back of the tongue, sweet on the tip, sour and salty at its edges ("innervation of taste".)

Maize and pellagra

Filippo Lussana was among the most important observers of pellagra.  In a paper published in Milan in 1856 Lussana and Carlo Frua stated clearly (and accurately), "It is our hypothesis that pellagra originates and prolifierates whenever the diet lacks protein (nitrogenous substance)."
Lussana and Frua said that the protein content of corn was only 12%, and well below the level needed for health. 
In fact, the protein level was even lower. Admitting that they did not understand the details of the physiological mechanisms, they maintained that the pellagra crisis differed from historical food crises since it stemmed from lack of protein rather than lack of calories.

Lussana found a direct relationship between the disease and a diet of corn deficient in albumin and nitrogen, such as that which grew in Bergamo.  He fought the views that Pellagra was due to toxins or to infectious disease, stating: "Italy is a country eminently agricultural and will recover from pellagra when the government protects agriculture".  
In 1862 Lussana published a polemical article in the Italian Gazette  addressed to Professor Paolo Mantegazza. 
Mantegazza had visited the people of Central and South America, finding no trace of pellagra, even with those whose diet was primarily of corn, 
and argued that therefore the exclusive food use of corn could not be the main and only cause of the disease. Lussana challenged this on the basis that the level of protein in the plant is modified by the climate and soil fertilization, with a comparative study shows that the corn of Vertova and Gandino also showed lower values than the French, 
reiterating that the lack of albumin in food was the cause of the pellagra endemic in some areas.

Other scientific works

In his booklet "Coffee" (1872) Lussana traces the history of this drink, analyzing the emergence and spread of places of production and statistical data on the main producing countries (Brazil, Puerto Rico, West Indies). He also includes a long list of citations and judgments about good and bad coffee, reporting objectively both negative and positive opinions.
In 1874 Lussana and Pietro Albertoni published a lengthy article in Lo Sperimentale about the effects of alcohol and related substances on various animals, detailing extensive experiments they had conducted in Padua.
Lussana was against the tax on salt. In a letter to Count Alessio Suardo in 1881 he underlined the necessity of sodium chloride in the tissues and blood, the need for its adequate presence in common food and its physiological and therapeutic uses, concluding in favor of a gradual elimination of the tax on salt.

In the paper "Human and comparative anatomy of cerebral convolutions" (Padua, 1886) Lussana, within the pseudo-sciences of physiognomy and phrenology, studies the anatomical correspondence in the brains of violent men, noting that the anatomy would vary with the inclinations and psychological attitudes of the subjects.
In the informative 1888 volume Exercise and rest Lussana deals with the relationship between physical activity and intellectual laziness. 
Stressing the importance of labor, he speaks of physical education from Greece onward, highlighting the need for rest after the physical action.

Literary works

Lussana had great respect for the arts.  He wrote 
In 1878 Lussana published A physiological lesson from Dante (1878), the text of a lecture he had given at the Royal Academy of Sciences, Letters and Arts of Padua on 20 May 1877. Lussana defined Dante as the "great physiologist" based on Purgatory XXV, where the poet explains the Aristotelico-Thomistic views on generation. Lussana attributed to Dante the role of a precursor of Darwin's theory of evolution, saying that Dante anticipated a modern discovery by showing that during the life of the embryo even the more advanced animals first develop those organs that they have in common with the more primitive organisms.

Despite the large number of Lussana's scientific publications, he also found time to engage in a number of literary works, 
mostly written without much study, about the dispute between the classical and romantic times. 
In "Arduino", a poem of four verses in imitation of the Canton of Roland of Ludovico Ariosto, Lussana glorifies the Lombard hero Arduino of Ivrea, 
seen as a champion of revolt against Henry II, Holy Roman Emperor.

With the tragic drama Brasmina, Lussana follows the example of the songs of Ossian by James Macpherson. 
Thus, the poetic romance Filiberto, and the three songs Disease, Escape, Revenge. 
There followed is an anonymous poetic romance with patriotic inspiration published in 1865 in Parma. 
Adalbert of Ivrea is a historical novel in which Lussana takes the opportunity of a psychological study of an unrestrained and unconventional amorous passion. 
Finally there is Romanze, 12 short verses in which Lussana describes war and love, the sacred drama of homeland and history, family, betrayal and discord among Italians. 
In 1866 he released an anonymous poem dedicated to the Italian War of 1860.

Memorials

In Bergamo, a street has been named after him since 1923, and the "Filippo Lussana" high school is also named after him
In Cenate Sopra a plaque commemorates his birthplace.  His house in Gandino is also commemorated with a plaque.

Selected bibliography

A sample of independently published papers and books from Lussano's huge output, which also included many papers published in learned journals, is given below:

Notes and references
Notes

Citations

Sources

Further reading

 In ricordo di Filippo Lussana, Bergamo, Savoldi 1924
 Rivista di Bergamo, Maggio 1925
 Carlo Traini, Filippo Lussana, Trescore Balneario, San Marco 1960
 Ezio Pellegrini, Sergio Stefanini, Filippo Lussana senior. La vita e le opere,  Trescore Balneario (Bg), San Marco 1999

External links
 

Italian physiologists
1820 births
1897 deaths
People from the Province of Bergamo
Italian poets
Italian male poets
Mayors of places in Lombardy
19th-century poets
19th-century Italian male writers